The Seven Stars is a former Fuller's pub at 253 North End Road, Fulham, London.

It was rebuilt in 1938 with a typical art deco facade, designed by John Nowell Parr, son of the famous pub architect T. H. Nowell Parr. However, there has been a pub on the site since at least the 19th century.

In 2009, it was sold by Fuller's to a developer, and closed in 2010.

Since 2013, it has been a student hostel, Yara Central, Kensington, owned by Yara Capital Ltd, with 24 studio rooms available to rent.

References

20th-century architecture in the United Kingdom
Pubs in the London Borough of Hammersmith and Fulham
Commercial buildings completed in 1921
West Kensington
Former pubs in London